Grabbist Hillfort is an Iron Age oval hillfort or defended enclosure, west of Dunster in Somerset, England.

Ploughing over the years has damaged or erased some of the original features including a possible inner rampart. If it was a hillfort it is believed to be unfinished.

An area just below the site is known as the "Giant's Chair" which is a depression formed by land slippage.

The site is designated as a scheduled monument.

References 

Hill forts in Somerset
Scheduled monuments in West Somerset
Iron Age sites in Somerset